Étienne de la Croix (Diocese of Évreux, 1579–1643), was a French Jesuit, missionary to India and author of a life of St Peter in Marathi:  (Goa, 1629).

Biography
De la Croix entered the Society of Jesus in 1599, and arrived in India in 1602. He succeeded the English Jesuit Thomas Stephens as Rector of the College at Rachol. He seems to have made a study of the Hindu Puranas and religious beliefs. A list of references given in his works shows that he used at least 26 Hindu puranas in the composition of his own purana. His Peter Purana, as it is popularly known, consisted of 12,000 ovis (verses) in a Marathi that contained a significant number of Konkani words and expressions. He also wrote in Konkani language, though none of these works survive, according to Alexandre Rhodes, writing in 1621.

In contrast to Thomas Stephens' Khristapurana, the Peter Purana is far more polemical.

References

Bibliography
Discursos sobre a vida do Apostolo Sam Pedro em que se refuta os principaes erros do gentilismo deste oriente: e se declarao varios misterios da nossa santa Fe: com varia Doutrina Vtil e necessaria a esta noua Christandade. Compostos em versos em lingoa Bramana Marasta pelo Padre Estevao da Cruz da Com., Frances. Empressos em Goa na Casa Professa de Jesus com licenca da Sancta Inquisicao e ordinario e dos superiores. Anno de nascimento de Christo Senhor Nosso de 1634. Goa, 1629-1634. 2 vols. in folio. Vol 1: 10 preliminary leaves - 358 numbered leaves of text. Vol. 2: 283 leaves. Biblioteca Nacional, Lisbon: complete. Central Library, Panjim, Goa: defective and incomplete. Microfilm available with Marathi Samshodhan Mandala, Mumbai 400 005.

Secondary
Priolkar, A.K. "French Author of a Marathi Purana, Fr Etienne de la Croix." Journal of the University of Bombay n.s. 29/2 (1959) 122-149.
Priolkar, A.K. Goa Re-discovered. Bhakta Books International, 1967.
Priolkar, A.K. The printing press in India: its beginnings and early development, being a quatercentenary commemoration study of the advent of printing in India in 1556. Bombay: Marathi Samshodhana Mandala, 1958.
Meyer, Christian and Felix Girke. The Rhetorical Emergence of Culture. Berghahn Books, 2011.
Saradesaya, Manohara. A History of Konkani Literature: From 1500 to 1992. New Delhi: Sahitya Akademi, 2000. See esp. pp. 49ff.
Pereira, Antonio. The makers of Konkani literature. A. Pereira, 1982.
Thekkedath, Joseph. History of Christianity in India: From the middle of the sixteenth to the end of the seventeenth century, 1542-1700. Volume 2 of History of Christianity in India. Bangalore: Theological Publications in India, for the Church History Association of India, 1982.
Boletim do Instituto Vasco da Gama 30 (1936) 72-74.
Boletim do Instituto Vasco da Gama 32 (1936) 57-60.
Boletim do Instituto Vasco da Gama 37 (1938) 121.

1579 births
1643 deaths
17th-century Indian Jesuits
17th-century French Jesuits
French Roman Catholic missionaries
Roman Catholic missionaries in India
French expatriates in India
Jesuit missionaries